Emydorhynchus is an extinct genus of non-mammalian synapsid.

See also

 List of therapsids

References
 The main groups of non-mammalian synapsids at Mikko's Phylogeny Archive

Dicynodonts
Lopingian synapsids of Africa
Fossil taxa described in 1935
Taxa named by Robert Broom